Ray may refer to:

Fish
 Ray (fish), any cartilaginous fish of the superorder Batoidea
 Ray (fish fin anatomy), a bony or horny spine on a fin

Science and mathematics

 Ray (geometry), half of a line proceeding from an initial point
 Ray (graph theory), an infinite sequence of vertices such that each vertex appears at most once in the sequence and each two consecutive vertices in the sequence are the two endpoints of an edge in the graph
 Ray (optics), an idealized narrow beam of light
 Ray (quantum theory), an equivalence class of state-vectors representing the same state

Arts and entertainment

Music 
 The Rays, an American musical group active in the 1950s
 Ray (musician), stage name of Japanese singer Reika Nakayama (born 1990)
 Ray J, stage name of singer William Ray Norwood, Jr. (born 1981)
Ray (Bump of Chicken album)
 Ray (Frazier Chorus album)
 Ray (L'Arc-en-Ciel album)
 Rays (Michael Nesmith album) (former Monkee)
 Ray (soundtrack), a soundtrack of the film Ray
 Ray (EP), an album by Panic Channel
 "Ray" (song), a song by Millencolin
 Ray or re, the second scale degree in solfege

Fictional characters
 Ray Barone, main character in the American sitcom Everybody Loves Raymond
 Ray Donovan, titular main character in the American TV drama series Ray Donovan
 Father Ray Mukada, priest character in the American TV drama series Oz
 Ray, a character in the television series Bear in the Big Blue House
 Ray, a firefly in the 2009 animated Disney film The Princess and the Frog
 Ray Stantz, a main character in the American film Ghostbusters
 Ray, a protagonist in Ray the Animation, a science fiction anime television series
 Ray, a main character in the Canadian television series Rusty Rivets
 Ray the Flying Squirrel, a video game character from Sonic the Hedgehog
 Ray (comics), a DC Comics character
 Ray (Ray Terrill), the second version of the character

Other media
 Ray (art journal), a British little magazine
 Ray (manga), a manga and anime series about a doctor with X-ray vision
 Ray (film), a 2004 film biography of African-American singer Ray Charles
 Ray (TV series), a 2021 Netflix anthology series based on Satyajit Ray's stories
 The Ray (Chardin), a 1728 painting by Jean Simeon Chardin

People

 Ray (surname)
 Ray (given name)
 Ray (wrestler), from Hong Kong

Places

Iran
 Ray, Iran, a city in the Greater Tehran metropolis
 Ray County, Tehran Province
 Ray, South Khorasan, a small village

Russia
 Ray (Smolensk region)
 Ray, Belgorod Oblast

United Kingdom
 River Ray,  South East England
 River Ray, Wiltshire, South West England

United States
 Ray, Alabama
 Ray, Arizona
 Ray, Indiana and Michigan, Steuben and Branch counties
 Ray Township, Michigan, Macomb County
 Ray, Minnesota
 Ray County, Missouri
 Ray, North Dakota

Elsewhere
 Ray, a Cambodian village in Ke Chong
 Mount Ray (British Columbia), a Canadian volcano
 Ray, Templeport, County Cavan, Ireland
 Ray, Jharkhand, India

Technology

 Rays Linux, a defunct Chinese operating system
 Sony Ericsson Xperia ray, a 2011 smartphone

Transportation

Vehicles
 Kia Ray, a 2011–present South Korean city car
 Kia Ray (2010 concept vehicle), a 2010 South Korean mid-size concept sedan
 Mitsuoka Ray, a 1996–2004 Japanese city car
 USS Ray, a U.S. Navy vessel

Other uses in transportation
 Raynes Park railway station, London, England (by GBR station code)
 Rays Engineering, a Japanese automotive wheel manufacturer

Other uses
 Rays (retailer), an Australian outdoors store
 Rāʾ ("ر"), a letter of the Arabic alphabet
 Raha-automaattiyhdistys (Finland's Slot Machine Association), a Finnish gambling provider
 Tampa Bay Rays, a Major League Baseball team

See also
 Rhea (disambiguation)
 Medullary ray (anatomy), the middle part of the Cortical lobule
 Medullary ray (botany), characteristic radial sheets or ribbons extending vertically, found in woods
 Radius (disambiguation)
 Radiation (disambiguation)
 Beam (disambiguation)
 Rye (disambiguation)
 Justice Ray (disambiguation)